Cianfanelli is an Italian surname. Notable people with the surname include:

Marco Cianfanelli (born 1970), South African artist
Nicola Cianfanelli (1793–1848), Italian painter and restorer

Italian-language surnames